Laurent Bezault (born 8 March 1966) is a French former racing cyclist. He competed in two events at the 1988 Summer Olympics. He also rode in the 1989 Tour de France.

Major results

1986
 2nd Chrono des Herbiers
1987
 2nd Overall Tour de la Communauté Européenne
1st Stage 7 (ITT)
 9th Overall Circuit Cycliste Sarthe
1988
 1st  Overall Boucles de la Mayenne
 1st Paris–Troyes
 1st Paris–Roubaix Espoirs
 2nd Coppa Sabatini
 4th GP Ouest–France
1989
 1st Tour de Vendée
 2nd Overall Tour de la Communauté Européenne
 5th Overall Critérium du Dauphiné Libéré
 5th Overall La Méditerranéenne
 5th Overall Critérium International
1991
 1st  Overall Cronostaffetta (TTT)
1992
 2nd Overall Tour du Poitou Charentes et de la Vienne
 3rd Overall Ronde van Nederland
 3rd Overall Vuelta a Aragón
 3rd Tour de Vendée
 4th Milano–Torino
 8th GP Eddy Merckx
1993
 1st Stage 4 Tour du Limousin
 2nd Overall Paris–Nice
 2nd Overall Circuit Cycliste Sarthe
 3rd Firenze–Pistoia
 3rd Paris–Camembert
 4th Trophée des Grimpeurs

References

External links
 

1966 births
Living people
French male cyclists
Olympic cyclists of France
Cyclists at the 1988 Summer Olympics
Sportspeople from Boulogne-Billancourt
Cyclists from Île-de-France